The following is a list of all suspensions and fines enforced in the National Hockey League (NHL) during the 2021–22 NHL season. It lists which players or coaches of what team have been punished for which offense and the amount of punishment they have received.

Players' money forfeited due to suspension or fine goes to the Players' Emergency Assistance Fund, while money forfeited by coaches, staff or organizations as a whole goes to the NHL Foundation.

Suspensions
Based on each player's average annual salary, divided by number of days in the season (200) for non-repeat offenders and games (82) for repeat offenders, salary will be forfeited for the term of their suspension.

† - suspension covered at least one 2021 NHL preseason game
‡ - suspension covered at least one 2022 postseason game
# - suspension was reduced on appeal
 - Player was considered a repeat offender under the terms of the Collective Bargaining Agreement (player had been suspended in the 18 months prior to this suspension)

Notes
1. All figures are in US dollars.
2. Fines generated for games lost due to suspension for off-ice conduct are calculated uniquely and irrespective of repeat offender status.
3. As the Winnipeg Jets were eliminated from the playoffs, the remaining game of Scheifele's suspension was instead made to be served in his first game of the 2021–22 NHL season.
4. While Kane's date of incident was not publicized, the NHL announced an investigation into potential violations of COVID-19 protocol on September 22, 2021. As Kane missed the San Jose Sharks' October 16, 2021 game while the investigation was pending, his 21 game suspension retroactively included that game in his total.
5. Spezza and the NHLPA appealed the suspension on December 8, 2021. On December 17, 2021, NHL Commissioner Gary Bettman announced he had heard the appeal and was reducing the suspension to four games; as Spezza had sat out the previous four Maple Leafs games, he became immediately eligible to return to the lineup.
6. Suspension was appealed by Marchand on February 11, 2022. On February 18, 2022, NHL Commissioner Gary Bettman announced he had heard the appeal and was upholding the original 6 game suspension levied to Marchand.
7. Suspension was appealed by Niederreiter on March 21, 2022. On March 28, 2022, NHL Commissioner Gary Bettman announced he had heard the appeal and was upholding the original 1 game suspension levied to Niederreiter.

Fines
Players can be fined up to 50% of one day's salary, up to a maximum of $10,000.00 for their first offense, and $15,000.00 for any subsequent offenses (player had been fined in the 12 months prior to this fine). Coaches, non-playing personnel, and teams are not restricted to such maximums, though can still be treated as repeat offenders.

Fines for players/coaches fined for diving/embellishment are structured uniquely and are only handed out after non-publicized warnings are given to the player/coach for their first offense. For more details on diving/embellishment fines:

 For coach incident totals, each citation issued to a player on his club counts toward his total.
 All figures are in US dollars.

Fines listed in italics indicate that was the maximum allowed fine.
 - Player was considered a repeat offender under the terms of the Collective Bargaining Agreement (player had been fined in the 12 months prior to this fine)

Notes
1. All figures are in US dollars.
2. While club fines typically go to the NHL Foundation, $1,000,000.00 of the fine will be redirected to fund local organizations in and around the Chicago community that provide counseling and training for, and support and assistance to, survivors of sexual and other forms of abuse.
3. DeAngelo was issued his first citation following an incident on October 31, 2021.
4. Bunting was issued his first citation following an incident on November 16, 2021.
5. Hathaway was issued his first citation following an incident on February 24, 2022.

Further reading

See also 
 2020–21 NHL suspensions and fines
 2022–23 NHL suspensions and fines
 2021 in sports
 2022 in sports
 2021–22 NHL season
 2021–22 NHL transactions

References

External links
NHL Collective Bargaining Agreement
NHLPA, NHL Announce 2020-21 Medical Protocols, Transition Rules and Approval of a Change to NHL Rule 83

Suspension and Fines
National Hockey League suspensions and fines